Samudrika Naval Marine Museum is a museum situated near the Andaman Teal House at Port Blair in India, designed to create awareness on various aspects of the oceanic environment. The museum is run by the Indian Navy. The museum has five sections presenting history of Andaman Islands, geographical information, people of Andaman, archaeology, and marine life. It also houses a vast collection of cells, corals and a few species of colourful fishes of the sea around the islands.

References

Naval museums in India
Port Blair
Indian Navy
Tourist attractions in the Andaman and Nicobar Islands